FGCS may refer to:

Facial gender confirmation surgery
Female genital cosmetic surgery
Fifth generation computer systems project
Forest Gate Community School a school in Newham, East London
Future Generation Computing Systems, an Elsevier scientific journal

See also 
 FGC (disambiguation)